This is a detailed discography for American country music singer-songwriter Don Williams that includes information on all of his studio albums, singles, greatest hits compilations and live albums. Don Williams was active from 1967 until his death in 2017. He was one of the best-selling male vocalists in country music in the 1970s and early 1980s.

Studio albums

1970s

1980s

1990s

2000s and 2010s

Live albums

Compilation albums

Singles

1970s

1980s

1990s and beyond

Other singles

Featured singles

Promotional singles

Music videos

See also
Pozo-Seco Singers
JMI Records
Bob McDill
Allen Reynolds

Notes

References

Country music discographies
Discographies of American artists